Mizraim (cf. Arabic مصر, Miṣr) is the Hebrew and Aramaic name for the land of Egypt and its people. It is ascribed to one of the sons of the Biblical figure Ham.

Linguistic analysis
Mizraim is the Hebrew cognate of a common Semitic source word for the land now known as Egypt. It is similar to Miṣr in Arabic, Miṣru in Akkadian, Misri in the 14th century B.C. Amarna tablets, Mṣrm in Ugaritic,  Mizraim in Neo-Babylonian texts, and Mu-ṣur in Assyrian neo-Aramaic records. To this root is appended the dual suffix -āyim, perhaps referring to the "two Egypts": Upper Egypt and Lower Egypt. This word is similar in pronunciation and spelling to the Hebrew words matsór and meitsár, meaning "siege" and "strait, distress" respectively, and may carry those connotations to Hebrew speakers.Some scholars  think it likely that Mizraim is a dual form of the word Misr meaning "land" and was translated literally into Ancient Egyptian as Ta-Wy (the Two Lands) by early pharaohs at Thebes, who later founded the Middle Kingdom.

Biblical accounts
According to Genesis 10, Mizraim son of Ham was the younger brother of Cush and elder brother of Phut whose families together made up the Hamite branch of Noah's descendants. Mizraim's sons were Ludim, Anamim, Lehabim, Naphtuhim, Pathrusim, Casluhim, and Caphtorim.19th century scholar Henry Welsford identifies this Mizraim of Egypt in the Book of Genesis as Minos.

In the Book of Exodus, it is considered the house of bondage. Regarding the passover, Moses says to the children of Israel, "Remember this day, in which ye came out from Mizraim, out of the house of bondage; for by strength of hand the LORD brought you out from this place; there shall no leavened bread be eaten."

The book of Deuteronomy forbids the children of Israel from abhorring a Mizri, an Egyptian, "because you were a stranger in his land."

Greco-Roman sources
According to Eusebius's Chronicon, Manetho had suggested that the great age of antiquity of which the later Egyptians boasted had actually preceded the Great Flood and that they were really descended from Mizraim, who settled there anew.According to Byzantine chronicler George Syncellus, the Book of Sothis, attributed to Manetho, identified Mizraim with the legendary first Pharaoh Menes, who is said to have unified the Old Kingdom and built Memphis. Mizraim also seems to correspond to Misor, who is said in Phoenician mythology to have been the father of Taautus, who was given Egypt, and later scholars noticed that it also recalls Menes, whose son or successor was said to be Athothis.

Islamic sources
According to medieval Islamic historians, such as Sibt ibn al-Jawzi, the Egyptian Ibn 'Abd al-Hakam, and the Persians al-Tabari and Muhammad Khwandamir, the pyramids, etc. had been built by the wicked races before the Deluge but that Noah's descendant Mizraim (Masar or Mesr) was later entrusted with reoccupying the region. The Islamic accounts also make Masar the son of a Bansar or Beisar and grandson of Ham, rather than a direct son of Ham, and add that he lived to the age of 700.

Fringe theory
Author David Rohl has suggested a different interpretation:

References

Bibliography

Children of Ham (son of Noah)